is a former Japanese football player. He is the goalkeeper coach J2 League club of Ventforet Kofu.

Club career
Nakagawa was born in Ube on October 22, 1978. After graduating from Meiji University, he joined Japan Football League club YKK (later YKK AP, Kataller Toyama) in 2001. He played as regular goalkeeper from first season. The club was promoted J2 League in 2009. He retired end of 2010 season.

National team career
In August 1995, Nakagawa was elected for the Japan U-17 national team for 1995 U-17 World Championship, but he did not play a single minute during the championship.

Club statistics

References

External links

j-league

1978 births
Living people
Meiji University alumni
Association football people from Yamaguchi Prefecture
Japanese footballers
J2 League players
Japan Football League players
Kataller Toyama players
Association football goalkeepers